Mara Cristina Gabrilli (born 28 September 1967) is a Brazilian psychologist, advertiser and politician affiliated with the Social Democratic Party. She was elected as a federal deputy representing the state of São Paulo in the 2010 election, being reelected four years later.

After becoming quadriplegic in 1994 due to a car crash, Gabrilli became an activist for people with disabilities, founding the Instituto Mara Gabrilli in 1997, advocating for their rights. Before being elected for the Brazilian Congress, Gabrilli was vereadora (councilwoman) for the city of São Paulo and the Municipal Secretary for People with disabilities.

In 2018, Gabrilli was elected to the Brazilian Senate.

In 2023, she left the Brazilian Social Democracy Party (PSDB) due to personal disagreements with recent party decisions and decided to join the Social Democratic Party (PSD).

References

External links
 Official site (in Portuguese)
 Profile in the Chamber of Deputies' website

1967 births
Living people
People from São Paulo
Brazilian Social Democracy Party politicians
Members of the Chamber of Deputies (Brazil) from São Paulo
Brazilian psychologists
Brazilian women psychologists
People with tetraplegia
Politicians with disabilities
Candidates for Vice President of Brazil
Social Democratic Party (Brazil, 2011) politicians